Jianzhatan Township (Mandarin: 尖扎滩乡) is a township in Jainca County, Huangnan Tibetan Autonomous Prefecture, Qinghai, China. In 2010, Jianzhatan Township had a total population of 4,871 people: 2,383 males and 2,488 females: 1,342 under 14 years old, 3,256 aged between 15 and 64 and 273 over 65 years old.

References 

Township-level divisions of Qinghai
Huangnan Tibetan Autonomous Prefecture